The 1972 All-Pacific-8 Conference football team consists of American football players chosen for All-Pacific-8 Conference teams for the 1972 NCAA University Division football season. The team was selected by the conference's eight head coaches.

Offensive selections

Quarterback
 Dan Fouts, Oregon

Running backs
 Kermit Johnson, UCLA
 James McAllister, UCLA

Tight end
 Charle Young, USC

Wide receivers
 Steve Sweeney, Cal
 Greg Specht, Oregon

Tackles
 Pete Adams, USC
 Bill Moos, Washington State
 Bruce Walton, UCLA

Guards
 Steve Ostermann, Washington State
 Rob Jurgenson, Oregon State

Center
 Dave Brown, USC

Defensive selections

Linemen
 John Grant, USC
 Gordy Guinn, Washington
 Bob Kampa, Cal
 James Sims, USC

Linebackers
 Steve Brown, Oregon State
 Jim Merlo, Stanford
 Richard Wood, USC

Defensive backs
 Allan Ellis, UCLA
 Bill Barley, Oregon State
 Calvin Jones, Washington
 Randy Polth, Stanford

Extra teams

Placekicker
 Rod Garcia, Stanford

Punter
 Bruce Barnes, UCLA

See also
1972 College Football All-America Team

References

All-Pacific-8 Conference Football Team
All-Pac-12 Conference football teams